Pamela Tola (born 15 October 1981) is a Finnish actress and director.

Tola was born in Ruotsinpyhtää, Finland. She has appeared on television since 2003. She appeared in the 2005 film Paha maa (Frozen Land), and starred as the main character in the 2006 film Saippuaprinssi (Soap Prince), both times working with Mikko Leppilampi. In 2008, Tola graduated with MA from the Theatre Academy's Department of Theatre and Drama. In 2018, she directed her first feature film Swingers, followed by Teräsleidit in 2020.

Personal life

Tola and her film producer husband Pauli Waroma filed for divorce in August 2011. They have two sons together. 
In 2015 she married actor Lauri Tilkanen with whom she has a son born in 2014. They got divorced in June of 2020

Tola is close friends with actress Pihla Viitala.

Partial filmography

As actress
Helmiä ja sikoja (2003)
Skene (television movie, 2004)
Paha maa (2005)
Caasha (television movie, 2005)
Tyttö sinä olet tähti (2005)
Saippuaprinssi (2006)
Beverly Hills Chihuahua (voice of Chloe in Finnish localization, 2008)
Lapland Odyssey (Napapiirin sankarit) (2010)
Beverly Hills Chihuahua 2 (voice of Chloe in Finnish localization, 2011)
Mannerheim (2011)
Härmä (2012)
Must Have Been Love (2013)
Heart of a Lion (2013)
Onnenonkija (2016)
Aurora (2019)

As director
Swingers (2018)
Teräsleidit (2020)

References

External links

1981 births
Living people
People from Ruotsinpyhtää
Finnish film actresses
Finnish television actresses
Finnish film directors
Finnish women film directors